Bard High School Early College Newark is a magnet public high school in Newark, in Essex County, New Jersey, United States, operating since its establishment in 2011 as part of the Newark Public Schools. Working together with Bard College, students earn 60 college credits as part of a liberal arts and sciences curriculum toward an associate degree in addition to a high school diploma. The college program is operated as a branch of Bard College at Simon's Rock and is accredited by the New England Association of Schools and Colleges.

As of the 2021–22 school year, the school had an enrollment of 381 students and 30.5 classroom teachers (on an FTE basis), for a student–teacher ratio of 12.5:1. There were 264 students (69.3% of enrollment) eligible for free lunch and 24 (6.3% of students) eligible for reduced-cost lunch.

Administration
The school's principal is Dr. Carla Stephens.

References

External links
Bard High School Early College Newark
Newark Public Schools

School Data for the Newark Public Schools, National Center for Education Statistics

2011 establishments in New Jersey
Educational institutions established in 2011
High schools in Newark, New Jersey
Magnet schools in New Jersey
Public high schools in Essex County, New Jersey